Xianglong (meaning "flying dragon" in Chinese) is a genus of Cretaceous lizard discovered in the Zhuanchengzi, near Yizhou, Yixian, Liaoning Province of China.<ref name="kerthan2007"/ It is known from LPM 000666, a single complete skeleton with skin impressions. The specimen comes from the Barremian-age Lower Cretaceous Yixian Formation, near Yizhou. The most notable feature about Xianglong is its bizarre oversized ribs, eight on each side, which were attached to a membrane of body tissue and allowed the lizard to glide. While in its original description it was considered to acrodont lizard, with a cladistic analysis in the same study suggesting that it was grouped with iguanians such as agamines, chamaeleonids, and leiolepidines, it was later shown that this was due to misinterpretation of the crushed skull, and its affinities with other lizards remains uncertain.

Description 
This is indicated by the unossified carpals and poorly-ossified tarsals. Metacarpal IV is shorter than the other metacarpals, and pedal digit V is greatly elongated. The radius and ulna are distally divergent. The body is covered in small, granular scales, showing little size variation. Xianglong had slightly curved claws, indicating that it was arboreal. The ribs of the animal, which functioned as gliding organs, were found in a half-open position, which indicates a post-mortem relaxation of the folded wing. So far this is the only known fossil gliding lizard, though there are other unrelated animals that also use their ribs to glide.

Gliding ability 
Xianglong is one of the few creatures that glide using their ribs. Other creatures, such as the flying squirrel and the Malabar flying frog, Rhacophorus malabaricus, have a different membrane attachment, toes to toes or limb to limb. Two creatures use the same way to glide, the present day Flying Lizard (genus Draco, Latin for dragon) and Triassic fossil reptiles such as Kuehneosaurus, but the Triassic look-alikes lived over 100 million years before Xianglong. Despite the  "rib-span", the lizard might have been quite agile in the air, possibly to escape the feathered dinosaurs that coexisted with it.

Xu Xing, a Chinese paleontologist and one of the describers of Xianglong, states that it is possible that it could have glided as far as half a football field, much farther than that of the modern Draco.

Taxonomy 
In the original paper describing it, Xianglong was recovered in a polytomy with the Agaminae, Chamaeleonidae and Leiolepidinae. This was based on the strict consensus of the four most parsimonious trees. Below is the tree recovered by Li et al (2007):

However, in a later 2022 publication, Susan E. Evans said that what the describing authors misinterpreted as acrodont dentition was actually the crushed, jagged broken edge of the jaw, rendering its identification as an iguanian doubtful.

Citations

External links

 Photo in the News: Ancient Lizard Glided Using Its Ribs Aalok Mehta National Geographic Society March 20, 2007
 Ancient Lizard Glided on Stretched Ribs by Ker Than, LiveScience March 19, 2007 01:00pm ET

Cretaceous lizards
Fossil taxa described in 2007
Early Cretaceous reptiles of Asia
Fossils of China
Yixian fauna